Lidegaard is a Danish surname. Notable people with the surname include:

Bo Lidegaard (born 1958), Danish historian, diplomat, author, and newspaper editor
Martin Lidegaard (born 1966), Danish politician

See also
Lindegaard

Danish-language surnames